Adult Themes for Voice is a 1996 album  by Mike Patton. Recorded in hotel rooms while touring as a member of Faith No More, the album is solely composed of vocal sounds arranged as noise music. Released on John Zorn's Tzadik Records label, the album has largely met with negative reviews citing its abstruse and inaccessible nature.

Production

Adult Themes for Voice is composed entirely of sounds produced vocally by Mike Patton, featuring no other instrumentation. The compositions include sounds described as "harsh scraping noises, squeaks, and underwater sounds". Patton recalled similar vocal experimentation from his childhood, first having taught himself to sing by imitating non-verbal sounds, and later being gifted a record by his parents which he described as "this little flexi-disc of mouth sounds, like guys that could make odd sounds. I don't know why they gave it to me, but that was one of my favourite records". The album was recorded in various hotel rooms while on tour as a member of Faith No More, using a TASCAM four-track Portastudio.

Release and reception

Adult Themes for Voice was released on April 23, 1996, on Tzadik Records. Tzadik is operated by John Zorn, a long-time collaborator with Patton.

AllMusic's Greg Prato rated the album three stars out of five, stating "there isn't a note of music on the album; it's essentially noise". Prato noted that the music's composition meant that songs flowed into each other "as a continuous piece", and could not point out any specific highlights as a result. Writing for Exclaim!, Joe Smith-Englehardt has described the album as "noise for the sake of noise", noting Patton's "incredibly unique vocals". Simon Young, writing for Kerrang!,  described both Adult Themes for Voice and Patton's follow-up, Pranzo Oltranzista, as "expensive lessons in buyer’s remorse". Writing in the book Avant Rock: Experimental Music from the Beatles to Bjork, philosophy professor Bill Martin compared the album to Yoko Ono's 1971 release Fly, and to the vocal techniques of Cathy Berberian and Joan La Barbara. Martin described the album as "quite radical", but questioned whether it would appeal to any particular audience.

Track listing

Footnotes

References

1996 debut albums
Mike Patton albums
Tzadik Records albums